is a city located in Chiba Prefecture, Japan. , the city had an estimated population of  31,722 in 14,558 households and a population density of 170 persons per km².

The name of the city consists of two kanji characters: the first, kamo (鴨), meaning "duck", and the second, kawa (川), meaning "river".

Geography
Kamogawa is near the southeastern tip of the Bōsō Peninsula, facing the Pacific Ocean, about 50 km south of the prefectural capital, Chiba, and about 85 km from the capital of Japan, Tokyo. Mount Kiyosumi is home to Seichō-ji. The Kamo River empties into the Pacific Ocean at Kamogawa.

Neighboring municipalities
Chiba Prefecture
Futtsu
Kimitsu
Katsuura
Minamibōsō
Kyonan
Ōtaki

Climate
Kamogawa has a humid subtropical climate (Köppen Cfa) characterized by warm summers and cool winters with light to no snowfall.  The average annual temperature in Kamogawa is 15.5 °C. The average annual rainfall is 1833 mm with September as the wettest month. The temperatures are highest on average in August, at around 26.0 °C, and lowest in January, at around 5.9 °C.

Demographics
Per Japanese census data, the population of Kamogawa has been gradually decreasing over the past 70 years.

History

Early history
The area of present-day Kamogawa was part of ancient Awa Province. Nichiren (1222 – 1282) was born in the Kominato district of Kamogawa, and his birthplace is commemorated at Tanjō-ji. During the Edo period, it was mostly tenryō territory controlled directly by the Tokugawa shogunate, with portions under the control of the feudal domains of Funagata Domain, Tateyama Domain, Iwasuki Domain and Tsurumaki Domain. The short-lived (1638-1690) Tōjō Domain and the Bakumatsu period Hanabusa Domain were also located within the borders of modern Kamogawa.

Modern history
In 1877,  Kamogawa suffered a notable cholera outbreak. At the start of the Meiji period, Kamogawa consisted of all of Nagasa District with two towns and nine villages, and two villages from neighboring Asai District. All of these villages and towns (including Kamogawa Town) became part of Awa District in 1890. In 1927 Awa-Kamogawa Station became the terminus of both the Sotobō Line and the Uchibō Line. The city sustained injuries and fatalities during World War II via aerial bombing by the United States. The city was occupied by American forces after the war. Soon after, land reform and economic reform were carried out in Kamogawa. In 1958 the coastal areas of Kamogawa became a part of Minami Bōsō Quasi-National Park, and the town became a tourist destination as a result of the establishment of the park. Kamogawa was elevated to city status on March 31, 1971.On February 11, 2005, the town of Amatsukominato (from Awa District) was merged into Kamogawa.

Government
Kamogawa has a mayor-council form of government with a directly elected mayor and a unicameral city council of 18 members. Kamogawa contributes one member to the Chiba Prefectural Assembly. In terms of national politics, the city is part of Chiba 12th district of the lower house of the Diet of Japan.

Economy
Kamogawa serves as a commercial center for the surrounding region of south-central Chiba Prefecture. Commercial fishing remains the primary industry in Kamogawa, which has five active fishing ports. The city is noted for its sardine and mackerel production. Rice farming and floriculture are practiced. The tourist industry is a growing component of the local economy, with visitors attracted to the area's beaches, hot spring resorts, Kamogawa Seaworld, and the Futomi Flower Center.

Transportation

Railway
 JR East – Uchibō Line
 –  – 
 JR East – Sotobō Line
 – -

Highway

Education
Kameda College of Health Sciences
Josai International University – Kamogawa Campus
Waseda University – Kamogawa Campus
Toyo University – Kamogawa Campus
 Kamogawa has nine public elementary schools and three public middle schools operated by the city government, and one public high school operated by the Chiba Prefectural Board of Education. There is also one private high school.

Sister city relations
 - Minobu, Yamanashi, Japan, from 1991
 - Manitowoc, Wisconsin, USA from 1993

Local attractions
Kamogawa Sea World, noted especially for its captive orcas and numerous other sea creatures
Tanjōji – Buddhist temple associated with Nichiren
Seichō-ji – Buddhist temple associated with Nichiren

Noted people from Kamogawa
Nichiren, noted Buddhist prelate
Tokiko Kato, singer, composer, lyricist, and actress
Yuka Murayama, writer
Shimaguchi Komao, composer and writer

Cultural references
The anime series Lagrange: The Flower of Rin-ne is set in Kamogawa.

References

External links

Official Website 

 
Cities in Chiba Prefecture
Populated coastal places in Japan